Oil reserves in the United Arab Emirates, according to its government, are about 107 billion barrels, almost as big as Kuwait's claimed reserves. Of the emirates, Abu Dhabi has most of the oil with  while Dubai has  and Sharjah has . Most of the oil is in the Zakum field which is the third largest in the Middle East with an estimated . The UAE's reserves-to-production is about 18 years.

References

Petroleum in the United Arab Emirates
United Arab Emirates
Geology of the United Arab Emirates